Northeastern High School is a small high school located near Fountain City in Wayne County, Indiana, USA. Founded in 1967, it serves the communities of Fountain City, Webster, Whitewater and Williamsburg.

Athletics
Northeastern participates in the Tri-Eastern Conference of which it has been a member since 1974. Previously, it was a member of the Mid-Eastern Conference from 1967 to 1974. NHS enjoys a fierce conference rivalry with three other Wayne County schools (Centerville, Hagerstown and Lincoln). In the 2013–2014 season, the Knights won their first boys' basketball conference title since 1985-86 and also their first ever boys' basketball sectional title.

NHS previously held the "longest high school football losing streak in Indiana history", losing 46 games consecutively from 1985 to 1990.

Mergers

Notable alumni
 Rich Mullins (1955-1997), contemporary Christian music singer

See also
 List of high schools in Indiana

References

External links

District website
IHSAA
Review
Rankings
Sports reference

Public high schools in Indiana
Schools in Wayne County, Indiana
1969 establishments in Indiana